Child is a surname. Notable people with the surname include:

Arthur Child (judge) (1852–1902), British judge at Trinidad and St Lucia
Arthur Child (1910–1996), Canadian businessman
Asa Child (1798–1858), American Attorney
Calvin G. Child (1834–1880), Son of Asa Child and an American Attorney 
C. Judson Child Jr. (1923–2004), American Episcopal bishop
Charles Manning Child (1869–1959), American zoologist
Desmond Child (born 1953), American musician and songwriter
Fay G. Child (1908-1965), American politician and newspaper editor
Francis Child (disambiguation)
Fred Child (born 1963), American radio host
Harry W. Child (1857–1931), American entrepreneur 
Jane Child (born 1967), Canadian musician
Jeremy Child (1944–2022), English actor
Joan Child (1921–2013), Australian politician
John Child (disambiguation)
Jonathan Child (1785–1860), American mayor of Rochester, New York
Josiah Child (1630–1699), English merchant, economist, and governor of the East India Company
Julia Child (1912–2004), American cook and author
Kirsty Child, Australian actress
Lauren Child (born 1965), English illustrator and children's writer
Lincoln Child (born 1957), American horror and thriller writer
Lydia Maria Child (1802–1880), American abolitionist, women's rights activist, Indian rights activist, novelist and journalist
Mollie Child (1908–1989), English cricketer
Paul Child (disambiguation)
Peter Child (born 1953), American composer and Professor of Music at Massachusetts Institute of Technology
Phoebe Child (1910–1990), English pioneer of the Montessori Method
Robert Child (disambiguation)
Samuel Child (1693–1752), English banker and Member of Parliament
Simon Child (born 1988), New Zealand field hockey player
Smith Child (disambiguation)
Thomas Child Jr. (1818–1869), American politician
Tim Child (born 1946), English television producer
Victor Child (1897–1960), Canadian newspaper illustrator, painter and etcher
William Child (disambiguation)

See also
Lee Child, pen name of English thriller writer Jim Grant (born 1954)
Child Villiers, an aristocratic surname

See also
Childe (surname)
Childs (disambiguation)